This is a list of communities of Tulu Nadu, a Tulu-speaking region spread over parts of present Karnataka, India (In alphabetical order).

 Billava
 Bunt
 Daivadnya Brahmin
 Devadiga
 Goud Saraswat Brahmins
 Tulu Gowda
 Koraga
 Kota Brahmins
 Mera
 Mogaveera
 Moolya
 Sapaliga/Sapalya
 Shettigar
 Shivalli Brahmins
 Sthanika Brahmins

Lists of populated places in Karnataka
Tulu Nadu